is a junction railway station in Miyagino-ku, Sendai, Miyagi, Japan, operated by East Japan Railway Company (JR East). The station also has a freight depot for the Japan Freight Railway Company (JR Freight).

Lines
It is 359.9 km from Tokyo Station.

Station layout
The station has two island platforms connected by an underground passageway. The station has a Midori no Madoguchi staffed ticket office.

Platforms

History
The station opened on 11 October 1888. The station was absorbed into the JR East network upon the privatization of the Japanese National Railways (JNR) on 1 April 1987.

Passenger statistics
In fiscal 2018, the station was used by an average of 4,610 passengers daily (boarding passengers only). The passenger figures for previous years are as shown below.

Surrounding area
 Sendai City Iwakiri Junior High School

See also
 List of Railway Stations in Japan

References

External links

  

Railway stations in Sendai
Railway stations in Japan opened in 1888
Tōhoku Main Line
Stations of East Japan Railway Company
Stations of Japan Freight Railway Company